Edward Buck may refer to:

 Edward Buck (rower) (1859–?), English schoolmaster and rower
 Edward Buck (lawyer) (1814–1876), American lawyer
 Edward Charles Buck (1838–1916), British civil servant in the Indian Civil Service
 Ed Buck (born 1954), American political activist